Massin is a surname. Notable people with the surname include:

Brigitte Massin (1927–2002), French musicologist and journalist
Caroline Massin (1802–77), French seamstress and bookseller
Dona Massin (1917–2001), Canadian choreographer
Jean Massin (1917–1986), French historian and musicologist
Kain Massin, Australian writer
Robert Massin, French graphic designer